PP-197 Sahiwal-II is a constituency of Provincial Assembly of Punjab.

See also
 PP-196 Sahiwal-I
 PP-198 Sahiwal-III

References

External links
 Election commission Pakistan's official website
 Awazoday.com check result
 Official Website of Government of Punjab

Provincial constituencies of Punjab, Pakistan